Esau Walter Simpson (born 6 October 1990) is a Grenadian swimmer. At the 2012 Summer Olympics, he competed in the Men's 100 metre freestyle, finishing in 43rd place overall in the heats, failing to qualify for the semifinals. He also competed in the 100 m event at the 2013 World Aquatics Championships. Born in Brooklyn, he competed at the collegiate level for the NCAA Division II Nova Southeastern University Sharks.

References

1990 births
Living people
Grenadian male freestyle swimmers
Olympic swimmers of Grenada
Swimmers at the 2011 Pan American Games
Swimmers at the 2012 Summer Olympics
Pan American Games competitors for Grenada
American people of Grenadian descent
Nova Southeastern University alumni
People from Brooklyn
Nova Southeastern Sharks athletes